Bhiloda is one of the 182 Legislative Assembly constituencies of Gujarat state in India.

It is part of Aravalli district and is reserved for candidates belonging to the Scheduled Tribes. This constituency is one of seven that together make up the Sabarkantha constituency of the Lok Sabha. Due to Tribal native called Bhil this Nagar has been named as Bhiloda as per revenue records available.

Segments
This assembly seat represents the following segments

 Meghraj Taluka
 Bhiloda Taluka (Part) Villages - agheshvari, Virpur, Chorimala, Raisingpur, Kundol (Pal), Bavaliya (Pal), Dhansor, Jhejhudi, Torda, Jayala, Andhariya, Kalyanpur, Bavaliya (Takapur), Indrapura, Kishangadh, Bedasan, Malasa, Malekpur, Ubsal, Bolundra, Vajapur, Siladri, Bhanmer, Rampuri, Ambabar, Pahada, Takatuka, Math Bolundra, Vansli, Vejpur, Ghanti, Jumsar (Chhapra), Jumsar, Munai, Khalvad, Lilchha, Bhiloda, Mankroda, Dholvani, Silasan, Budheli, Dharasan, Patiyakuva, Vasaya, Jambudi, Panch Mahudi, Ode, Bornala, Budharasan, Ajitpura, Abhapur, Meru (Bhetali), Bhutavad, Naranpur, Mau (Navalpur), Sunsar, Desan, Narsoli, Khumapur, Vankaner, Rintoda, Nava Bhetali, Jasvantpura, Hathiya, Dodisara Nana, Dodisara Mota, Chitariya, Sonasan, Kadvath, Ansol, Pahadiya, Odha Pada, Rangpur, Nava Venpur, Dhandhasan, Raypur, Jesingpur, Bhetali, Vasai, Bhatera, Chiboda, Thuravas, Akodiya, Lokhan, Rampur, kheroj, Kaleka, Mandhari, Nandoj, Karanpur, Hardaspur, Dhamboliya, Palla, Dhuleta (Palla), Venpur, Vaktapur, Karchha, Mota Samera, Dahgamda, Ravtavada, Mota Kanthariya, Ramera, Lusadiya, Nana Kanthariya, Nana Samera, Padardi, Shamalaji, Rudardi, Meravada, Gadhiya, Rudral, Kheradi, Vanzar, Chibhadiyata, Janali, Moti Bebar, Napda (Khalsa), Vajapur (Kherancha), Khari, Shamalpur, Bahecharpura, Dolatpur, Rampur (Moti), Sabran, Sarkilimdi, Lakshmanpura, Gali Semro, Vanka Timba, Kagda Mahuda, Vaghpur, Devni Mori, Bhavanpur, Kherancha, Sodpur, Napda (Jagiri), Khiloda, Shobhayada (Jagiri), Vansera, Gadadar, Asal, Khodamba, Kuski, Himatpur, Kundol (Dahgamda), Godh (Kuski), Adhera, Lalpur, Brahmpuri, Vandiyol, Sunokh, Vagodar, Chhapara Kuski, Jaliya

Member of Legislative Assembly

Election results

2022

2017

2012

See also
 List of constituencies of the Gujarat Legislative Assembly
 Aravalli district

References

External links
 

Aravalli district
Assembly constituencies of Gujarat